NGC 1936 (also known as IC 2127 and ESO 056-EN111) is an emission nebula which is part of the larger LMC-N44 nebula located in the Dorado constellation in the Large Magellanic Cloud. It was discovered by John Herschel in 1834 and added to the Catalogue of Nebulae and Clusters of Stars as NGC 1936. It was later observed by John Dunlop on September 27, 1936 and Williamina Fleming in 1901 and added to the Index Catalogue as IC 2127. Its apparent magnitude is 11.60.

References

External links 
 

Emission nebulae
ESO objects
IC objects
1936
Dorado (constellation)
Large Magellanic Cloud
Astronomical objects discovered in 1834